Actua Soccer (VR Soccer in North America) is a sports video game developed and published by Gremlin Interactive for MS-DOS, PlayStation, and Sega Saturn.

The game features a variety of teams and leagues to choose from, including national teams and club teams from various countries. Players can create their own teams and customize team kits, as well as participate in various game modes, such as exhibition matches, leagues, and tournaments. 

Actua Soccer received positive reviews upon its release for its realistic gameplay and depth of features.

Gameplay 
Actua Soccer contains only 44 national teams, each containing 22 players. However, in 1996 a new version containing clubs was released: Actua Soccer: Club Edition. It contained 20 Premier League teams from the 1996/1997 season, with players displayed in "Panini-style" photos and with individualised statistics. Commentary was provided by Barry Davies.

Development
This was the first football video game to include a full 3D graphics engine with players rendered as three-dimensional figures. Sheffield-based Gremlin used Sheffield Wednesday's Andy Sinton, Chris Woods and Graham Hyde as motion capture models.

The Club Edition was developed using the engine used for Gremlin's previous football title UEFA Euro 96 England.

Reception

By 1997, the game had sold more over a million copies for MS-DOS and PlayStation around the world.

In 1996, GamesMaster ranked Actua Soccer 85th on their "Top 100 Games of All Time."

Reviewing the Club Edition Saturn Power's Dean Mortlock gave a score of 65/100, criticising "sloppy controls and poor artificial intelligence". He concluded, "Sorry Gremlin but if Worldwide Soccer is one of the Manchester Uniteds of this world, then Actua Soccer Club Edition is more like a Swindon Town". Sega Saturn Magazine's Lee Nutter argued that "very little has been changed from its Euro 96 incarnation" and that it lacked "the speed, playability and overall polish of Sega's seemingly untouchable Worldwide Soccer '97".

References

External links

1995 video games
Association football video games
DOS games
PlayStation (console) games
Sega Saturn games
Video games scored by Kevin Saville
Gremlin Interactive games
Video games developed in the United Kingdom